Hazeldean is a community in the Canadian province of New Brunswick. It is located around the intersection of Route 108 and Route 395 halfway between Plaster Rock and New Denmark close to Blue Bell Lake.  Today, there are approximately 200 residents in Hazeldean.

History

In the early part of the 20th century, the community sprung up around a train station.

Notable people

See also
List of communities in New Brunswick

References

Communities in Victoria County, New Brunswick